Tashkooh or Firing Mount, is a mountain near the Ramhormoz, Iran.

Tashkooh which also named Atashkooh (in Persian means Fire Mount), is known for its permanent flames. This mount is always firing, because of the sulfur vapors rising from the porous layer of mountain surface and firing affected by the sublimation and nebulization.

Tashkooh is near the pair of villages called Mamatin, between Ramhormoz and Izeh.

See also
Yanar Dag - fire mount located in Azerbaijan

Landforms of Khuzestan Province
Mountains of Iran
Sulfur mines
Tourist attractions in Khuzestan Province
Mountains of Khuzestan Province